Andreja Petrovic (born 1 February 2000) is a Norwegian tennis player.

Petrovic has a career high ATP singles ranking of 1264 achieved on 7 November 2022. He also has a career high ATP doubles ranking of 1867 achieved on 13 September 2021.

Petrovic made his ATP main draw debut at the 2022 ATP Cup as one of the five members of the Norwegian team. The following year he was selected again as a member of the Norwegian team at the 2023 United Cup.

Petrovic plays college tennis at Florida State University after transferring from the University of North Dakota.

References

External links

2000 births
Living people
Norwegian male tennis players
Sportspeople from Stavanger
Florida State Seminoles men's tennis players
21st-century Norwegian people